Keanan Dols (born 24 July 1998) is a Jamaican swimmer. He competed in the men's 200 metre individual medley and men's 200 metre butterfly at the 2020 Summer Olympics.

Born in Jamaica, he grew up in Sarasota, Florida and swam for the University of Pennsylvania, from where he graduated in 2022.

References

1998 births
Living people
Jamaican male swimmers
Olympic swimmers of Jamaica
Swimmers at the 2020 Summer Olympics
Sportspeople from Sarasota, Florida
Jamaican emigrants to the United States
Penn Quakers men's swimmers
Swimmers at the 2022 Commonwealth Games
Commonwealth Games competitors for Jamaica
Competitors at the 2018 Central American and Caribbean Games